Slidell Independent School District is a public school district based in the community of Slidell, Texas (USA).  Located in Wise County, a portion of the district extends into Denton, Cooke, and Montague counties. The small community of Greenwood also lies within the district.

Schools
Slidell ISD has two campuses -

Slidell Junior High/High School (Grades 7-12) 
Slidell Elementary (Grades PK-6)

In 2009, the school district was rated "academically acceptable" by the Texas Education Agency.

References

External links
Slidell ISD

School districts in Wise County, Texas
School districts in Denton County, Texas
School districts in Cooke County, Texas
School districts in Montague County, Texas